Abundius of Umbria, also known as Abundius of Syria (died 303) was a deacon and martyr during the Diocletian persecution.

Biography
He was the grandson of Anastasius, and accompanied him and others from Syria to Umbria, where he was martyred.

No specific feast day in his name is known.

References

Sources
Holweck, F. G., A Biographical Dictionary of the Saints. St. Louis, MO: B. Herder Book Co. 1924.

Year of birth missing
303 deaths
4th-century Christian martyrs
4th-century Romans
Christians martyred during the reign of Diocletian